In modern usage, civil time refers to statutory time as designated by civilian authorities. Modern civil time is generally national standard time in a time zone at a fixed offset from Coordinated Universal Time (UTC), possibly adjusted by daylight saving time during part of the year.  UTC is calculated by reference to atomic clocks and was adopted in 1972.  Older systems use telescope observations.

In traditional astronomical usage, civil time was mean solar time reckoned from midnight. Before 1925, the astronomical time 00:00:00 meant noon, twelve hours after the civil time 00:00:00 which meant midnight. HM Nautical Almanac Office in the United Kingdom used Greenwich Mean Time (GMT) for both conventions, leading to ambiguity, whereas the Nautical Almanac Office at the United States Naval Observatory used GMT for the pre-1925 convention and Greenwich Civil Time (GCT) for the post-1924 convention until 1952. In 1928, the International Astronomical Union introduced the term Universal Time for GMT beginning at midnight.

In modern usage, GMT is no longer a formal standard reference time: it is now a name for the time zone  UTC+00:00. Universal Time is now determined by reference to distant celestial objects: UTC is derived from International Atomic Time (TAI), and is adjusted by leap seconds to compensate for variations in the rotational velocity of the Earth. Civil Times around the world are all defined by reference to UTC. [In many jurisdictions, legislation has not been updated and still refers to GMT: this is taken to mean UTC+0.]

See also
 
 
 
 :Category:Time by country
 :Category:Time zones

References

External links
Time Scales

Time scales